Saint Hervé ( 521 – 575 AD), also known as Harvey, Herveus, or Houarniaule, was a sixth-century Breton saint. Along with Saint Ives, he is one of the most popular of the Breton saints. He was born in Guimiliau (Gwimilio).

Legend 
Hervé was the son of a Welsh bard named Hyvarnion, who had studied under Cadoc. Hyvarnion became a minstrel at the court of Childebert I. His mother was Rivanone, a woman of surpassing beauty who knew the properties of plants and herbs.

Hervé was born blind. His father died when Hervé was still quite young. He inherited his father's harp. His mother became an anchoress and entrusted the seven-year-old boy to the care of his uncles who placed him with a learned hermit who lived in the forest. At about fourteen years of age, he went to study at the monasastic school at Plouvien, where his maternal uncle, Gourvoyed was abbot. Hervé grew up to become a teacher and minstrel. 

With his disciple Guiharan, Hervé lived near Plouvien as a hermit and bard. He had the power to cure animals and was accompanied by a domesticated wolf. His wolf devoured the ox or donkey Hervé used in plowing. Hervé then preached a sermon that was so eloquent that the wolf begged to be allowed to serve in the ox's stead. Hervé's wolf pulled the plow from that day on.

He was joined by disciples and refused any ordination or earthly honour, accepting only to be ordained as an exorcist.  He died in 556 AD and was buried at Lanhouarneau.

Veneration
Saint Hervé is venerated throughout Brittany. His feast day is June the 17th.

For fear of the Normans, his relics were removed to a silver shrine in the chapel of the Château de Brest. Given to the Bishop of Nantes, they were lost during the Revolution.

See also
 Plomodiern Parish close

References

External links
 Patron Saints: Saint Hervé
 Saint Yves and Saint Hervé
  Saint Hervé

556 deaths
Medieval Breton saints
French hermits
People from Finistère
6th-century Christian saints
Year of birth uncertain
Wolves in folklore, religion and mythology
521 births
6th-century Breton people
Animals in Christianity